Cleveland "Big Cat" Williams (June 30, 1933 – September 10, 1999) was an American professional boxer. A poll in The Ring magazine rated him as one of the finest boxers never to win a title.

Early life
Born in Griffin, Georgia, Williams started working at a pulpwood mill at the age of 13, and began his professional boxing career in his home state just a year later. He reported winning four of his first six fights, but was barred from competing until he turned 18 after an official learned of his age.

Early boxing career
Williams turned professional in 1951 and fought many of the best heavyweights of his era. During the late 1950s and early 1960s, the 6 ft 2 in Williams was a top-rated heavyweight. His quest to obtain a title fight, however, was consistently derailed. First he was knocked out by Sonny Liston on April 15, 1959. Williams recovered from the Liston fight to score more wins, but was again stopped by Liston in two rounds in their rematch on March 21, 1960. His quest for the title was later stalled when he was held to a draw by Eddie Machen on July 10, 1962, and when he dropped a split decision on March 13, 1963 to Ernie Terrell, a fighter he had previously knocked out in seven rounds in 1962. During this time frame, he defeated Billy Daniels.

Police shooting incident
On the evening of November 29, 1964, during the height of the civil unrest of the American Civil Rights Movement, a car driven by Williams was stopped near Houston, Texas, by highway Patrolman Dale Witten, who stated afterwards Williams was speeding. According to the police report Williams resisted arrest, and the officer's .357 magnum revolver went off during an ensuing struggle, hitting Williams in the stomach and lodging in his right hip. Williams underwent four operations over the subsequent seven months to address injuries to his colon and right kidney. The right kidney ultimately had to be removed in June 1965. Hugh Benbow, his manager, and Sonny Liston, former world champion, visited Cleveland Williams in the hospital. After his partial recovery Williams was fined $50 and briefly jailed after pleading no contest to charges arising from the incident. (Patrolman Witten visited Williams to wish him luck the day before his 1966 fight with Muhammad Ali, with both men saying they had "no hard feelings" toward the other).

Recovery and return to boxing
The injury, surgeries and subsequent convalescence caused Williams to lose over 60 pounds, and over 17 months of his career. He regained his weight and strength by tossing 80-pound bales of hay daily on a cattle ranch till he had regained his fighting weight and physique. On February 8, 1966, Williams received a standing ovation from the Houston crowd as he returned to the ring, and knocked out Ben Black in the first round.

Williams competed for the heavyweight championship against Muhammad Ali on November 14, 1966, but was badly outclassed, and was knocked down twice in the third round ending the match. Williams retired from boxing after the 1966 Championship defeat, but later made a comeback. Although able to defeat journeymen fighters, he suffered several knockout losses before retiring permanently in 1972.

Later life
The Ring in the 1980s reported he worked as a forklift truck driver in his later years.

Death
On September 3, 1999, Williams was knocked down by a car in a hit and run accident while walking across a street in Houston, Texas; he died of his injuries at Ben Taub Hospital on September 10, 1999,
at the age of 66. Williams was buried in Paradise North Cemetery in Houston.

Tributes
He ended his career with a record of 80 wins (60 KOs), 13 losses and 1 draw. George Foreman interviewed in retirement described Williams as possessing one of the three hardest punches he had experienced professionally, also stating that he and Williams had been sparring partners in their early careers. George Chuvalo also said Williams was one of the hardest punchers he had faced in his own professional career. Williams, aged 38, lost by decision to veteran Chuvalo over 10 rounds at the Astrodome in Houston, Texas, in November 1971. Sonny Liston stated Williams was the hardest puncher he'd ever been in the ring with.

In 2003 Williams was ranked 49th in The Rings list of 100 greatest punchers of all time.

Professional boxing record

References

 ALI's DOZEN, ESPN Home Entertainment/Genius Entertainment, 2007.

External links

 
 Brief Lives - Cleveland Williams from Hannibal Boxing

1933 births
1999 deaths
Heavyweight boxers
American male boxers